In 2000, Lift For Life Academy (LFLA) became the first independent charter school to open in the City of St. Louis.

The academy, located in what was originally the Manufacturers Bank and Trust building, then later a Mercantile Bank, was established to provide an education to middle school students. It is now serving nearly 800 students in grades K–12.  The elementary school is a half block south at 1920 South 7th Street.

The idea for the academy grew out of Cohen's other nonprofit agency, Lift For Life Gym, established in 1988 as a weightlifting organization for at-risk children located on the north side of St. Louis, 14th & Cass.

Principals

Elementary School, 1920 South 7th Street, St. Louis, MO 63104
Thomas Devitt: 2019present

Middle School, 1731 South Broadway, St. Louis, MO 63104
 Dr. Alicia Leathers

High School, 1731 South Broadway, St. Louis, MO 63104
 Jeffery Edwards

References

External links
Official website

Charter schools in Missouri
Educational institutions established in 1998
High schools in St. Louis
Middle schools in St. Louis
Public middle schools in Missouri
Public high schools in Missouri
1998 establishments in Missouri